Wind Star is a motor sailing yacht, sailing as a cruise ship for Windstar Cruises. She is one of an unusual class of only three vessels (Wind Star,  and ), designed as a modern cruise ship but carrying an elaborate system of computer-controlled sails on four masts.

See also 
List of large sailing vessels

References

Cruise ships
Four-masted ships
Individual sailing vessels
1985 ships